Ángel Félix Fleitas Husta (1914-2006) was a Major League Baseball shortstop.

Playing career
He made his major league debut at age 33 for the Washington Senators, playing in 15 games and going 1-for-13 at the plate.

His younger brother, Andrés Fleitas, was a long-time baseball star in Cuba, Mexico, and in the minor leagues.

Sources

1914 births
2006 deaths
Major League Baseball shortstops
Washington Senators (1901–1960) players
Chattanooga Lookouts players
Atlanta Crackers players
Austin Pioneers players
Greenville Spinners players
Montgomery Grays players
Montgomery Rebels players
Major League Baseball players from Cuba
Cuban expatriate baseball players in the United States
People from Abreus, Cuba